Phytoecia scutellata is a species of beetle in the family Cerambycidae. It was described by Johan Christian Fabricius in 1793, originally under the genus Saperda. It has a wide distribution in Europe, although its populations in Germany and the Czech Republic are reportedly extinct.

P. scutellata feeds on Falcaria vulgaris.

References

Phytoecia
Beetles described in 1793